Tamás Báló (born 12 January 1984) is a Hungarian football player who plays for Dunaújváros.

Honours
Paksi SE 
Hungarian Second Division: Winner 2006

Club statistics

Updated to games played as of 11 March 2020.

References
Paksi FC Official Website
HLSZ

1984 births
Living people
People from Kalocsa
Hungarian footballers
Association football defenders
Dunaújváros FC players
Paksi FC players
Dunaújváros PASE players
Nemzeti Bajnokság I players
Nemzeti Bajnokság II players
Sportspeople from Bács-Kiskun County